The following tables show the world record progression in the men's and women's 1000 metres as ratified by the World Athletics.

Men
The first world record in the men's 1000 metres was recognised by the IAAF in 1913. 27 world records have been ratified by the IAAF in the event.

Women
The first world record in the women's 1000 metres was recognised by the IAAF in 1922. 13 world records have been ratified by the IAAF in the event.

References

1000
Middle-distance running